See You After School (lit, "Rooftop After School") is a 2006 South Korean comical melodrama about a typical loser's zero to hero conquest.

Plot 
Goong-dahl, a typical loser billed as the "unluckiest man alive" returned to the school after one year's intense training of reject student's treatments. Now he is up to the challenge of posing himself  other than a typical loser. With the leads from his another old fellow mate he started with a new face by threatening and rescuing hot girl "Min-ah" from several oldies in the school. Everything went smoothly up to the plan until one of the bully is happened to be the schools notorious thug "Jae-koo" thus receiving invitation to a grand duel on the roof top after the school.

After the light of adventure shading with the price of upcoming fierce grand duel Goong-dahl along with his ally seeks alternatives to avoid the grand duel. But adding more wood to the fire all the plans back fired and cemented his legend thanks to bolstering myths spread by famous mouth flickers in the school.

Meanwhile, unknown to "Goong-dahl" group of thugs from outside also trying to hunt him mistakenly believing he is their arch enemy Jae-koo. Nevertheless, during the intermission Goong-dahl fallen in love with Min-ah and became the resurrection dragon of loser students' union in the school.

But after all the hard work done, he is survived by only two options before the duel. Either become a predator of fellow losers or the protector of fellow losers. What will be his ultimatum? Is once a loser forever a loser?

Cast 
 Bong Tae-gyu as Namgoong Dahl
 Kim Tae-hyun as Ma Yun-sung
 Jung Yoon-jo as Choi Min-ah
 Ha Seok-jin as Kang Jae-goo
 Jo Dal-hwan as Byung-goo
 Park Chul-min as homeroom teacher
 Im Hyun-sik as doctor
 Cho Soo-hyang as Child
 Chu Sang-mi as female doctor
 Son Byeong-wook as Tae-son
 Choi Eun-joo as Mae-soon
 Jeong Dae-hun as student on bus
 Lee Dal-hyeong as Park Ki-bong
 Noh Hyung-ok as Hong-soo
 Lee Je-hoon as Ahn-kyung
 Lee Ho-young as Chinese teacher
 Hong Gyung-yeon as Dal's mother
 Lee Moo-saeng as Joon Tae

References

External links 
 
 
 

2006 films
2000s Korean-language films
Films directed by Lee Seok-hoon
South Korean comedy films
2006 comedy films
2000s South Korean films
CJ Entertainment films
Cinema Service films